Samsu County is a kun, or county, in Ryanggang province, North Korea.  Prior to 1954, it was part of South Hamgyŏng province.

Geography
On its northern border, Samsu shares the Yalu River with China.  It also shares a border with the province of North P'yŏngan.  To the south, it occupies the northern tip of the Kaema Plateau.  The southern and western reaches of Samsu abound with mountains. Due to the rugged terrain, transportation is difficult.

The highest peak of Samsu is Turungbong (두릉봉, 1921 m).  The chief streams are the Changjin, Chungp'yŏng and Yalu rivers (this is probably the reason for its name, 삼수(三水), which literally means 'three rivers'). Due to its high inland location, Samsu enjoys bitterly cold winters.

Administrative divisions
Samsu county is divided into 1 ŭp (town), 1 rodongjagu (workers' district) and 23 ri (villages):

Economy
The chief industries in Samsu are logging and farming. Despite the rugged terrain, rice cultivation is widespread; in addition, slash-and-burn agriculture is practiced in the high fields. Local crops include potatoes, maize, soybeans, oats and rye. The Yalu is used to ship rough logs downstream. There are also local deposits of gold ore.

Transportation
The Pukbunaeryuk Line of the Korean State Railway serves the county, as do various conventional roads. There are multiple roads going out to Kanggye and Hyesan, but all have checkpoints.

See also
Geography of North Korea
Administrative divisions of North Korea
Ryanggang

External links

Counties of Ryanggang